Edwin Alexander Bushe (born 11 April 1951) is a former Irish cricketer. A right-handed batsman and wicket-keeper, he made his debut for Ireland in July 1979 against Scotland. He went on to play for Ireland on six occasions, his last match also against Scotland in August 1980. Two of his matches had first-class status.

References
CricketEurope Stats Zone profile

1951 births
Living people
Irish cricketers
People from Lurgan
Cricketers from Northern Ireland
Wicket-keepers